The nineteenth series of the British medical drama television series Holby City commenced airing in the United Kingdom on BBC One on 11 October 2016 and concluded airing in the United Kingdom on BBC One on 19 December 2017. The series consists of 64 episodes; an increase from the previous series.

Episodes

Production and reception 
The series began airing on Tuesday nights on BBC One from 11 October 2016, and concluded on 19 December 2017. Story conferencing for the series began on 15 March 2016. Oliver Kent continued his role as the executive producer of the show until December 2016, when he was appointed Head of Continuing Drama Series for BBC Scripted Studios. Simon Harper served as the series producer until December 2016, where he was then subsequently appointed acting executive producer until 8 June 2017, where he was then officially appointed the position of executive producer. As a result of Harper's appointment, Kate Hall took over as the show's series producer. The series consisted of 64 episodes.

On 21 November 2017, it was announced that this series would feature an "explosive" two-part episode focusing on the proposed merger between Holby City Hospital and St. Francis Hospital. Harper billed the episodes as "stunningly dramatic and moving". The episodes introduce John Gaskell, portrayed by Paul McGann, and heavily focus on Jac Naylor (Marcel), Ric Griffin (Quarshie) and Henrik Hanssen (Henry). Gaskell arrives and tries to help the hospital through their challenges but creates conflict with Jac, who is battling personal and professional issues at the same time. Sophie Dainty of Digital Spy reported that the hospital would be "plunged into darkness, with the greatest threat the hospital has ever experienced". Harper said he was "enormously proud" of the cast, crew and head writer Andy Bayliss, the show's head writer. On the episode, Harper commented, "You'll see our NHS heroes instinctively rush towards the hospital's greatest peril yet in a story that changes lives forever".

In August 2017, storylines from series 19, including Dom's domestic abuse, Jasmine's death and Mo and Mr T's relationship, were included in the longlist for Best Drama Storyline at the Inside Soap Awards. Dom's domestic abuse storyline made the viewer-voted shortlist, but lost out to Casualty helicopter crash. At the 2018 Writers' Guild of Great Britain Awards, Peter Mattessi won the Best Long Running TV Series category for his episode "Rocket Man". Holby City was shortlisted in the "Best Soap/Continuing Drama" category at the 2018 Broadcast Awards, but lost out to Channel 4 soap opera Hollyoaks. Judges for the awards praised Jasmine's death and felt that it was "a reminder that Holby's heroes don't always save the day." They also liked the hostility between Jasmine and Fran, who they called "psychologically fractured", and Fran's fall from the hospital's roof.

Cast

Overview
The series begins with 16 roles receiving star billing. Guy Henry portrays Henrik Hanssen, the hospital's chief executive officer and a consultant general surgeon. Hugh Quarshie plays Ric Griffin, the clinical lead of Keller ward, and later the Acute Assessment Unit, and a consultant general surgeon, who later acted as the hospital's CEO. Catherine Russell stars as Serena Campbell, the clinical lead of the AAU and a consultant general surgeon, and Rosie Marcel acts as Jac Naylor, the clinical lead of Darwin ward and a consultant cardiothoracic surgeon. John Michie portrays Guy Self, a consultant neurosurgeon working on Darwin ward, and Chizzy Akudolu plays Mo Effanga, a consultant on the cardiothoracic surgery ward, Darwin. Bob Barrett stars as Sacha Levy, a consultant general surgeon and clinical skills teacher on Keller ward, who is later promoted to the clinical lead of Keller ward. James Anderson acts as Oliver Valentine, a specialist registrar in cardiothoracics on Darwin, and later in general surgery on the AAU. Joe McFadden plays Raf di Lucca, a general surgical specialist registrar on the AAU and later, Keller ward. Camilla Arfwedson appears as Zosia March, a CT2 doctor and later, cardiothoracic specialist registrar on Darwin ward, while David Ames portrays Dominic Copeland, a CT2 doctor and later, a general surgical specialist registrar on Keller ward. Eleanor Fanyinka acts as Morven Digby, an F2 doctor and the foundation doctor representative, and later CT1 doctor, on the AAU, while Lucinda Dryzek stars as Jasmine Burrows, an F1 doctor on Darwin ward, and later Keller ward and the AAU. Alex Walkinshaw plays Adrian Fletcher, the ward manager of the AAU and later, director of nursing services, while Kaye Wragg portrays Essie Harrison, the transplant co-ordinator and a staff nurse on Keller ward. Ben Hull, Jules Robertson and Marc Elliott continue their semi-regular roles as consultant obstetrician/gynaecologist Derwood "Mr T" Thompson, clinical audit assistant (and later, porter) Jason Haynes and general surgical specialist registrar Isaac Mayfield.

Henry departs the series in episode 3 although producers confirmed it was a temporary break and the character would return in the future. Hanssen guest appears in episode 13, before returning in episode 18. Michie and Jonathan McGuiness (who played semi-recurring character Tristian Wood) depart in episode 6. It was confirmed in June 2017 that Michie had returning to filming, following reports alluding to his return. Guy returns in episode 43, and departs in episode 51. Kaisa Hammarlund makes her final appearance as her semi-recurring character, bank nurse Inga Olsen in episode 13. Russell took a break in 2017 to star in a production of What The Butler Saw and Serena departs in episode 26. She will return in the following series. Elliott makes his final appearance in episode 27 at the conclusion of his storyline. Akudolu's departure from the series was revealed on 12 May 2017. Akudolu told Laura-Jayne Tyler of Inside Soap that Hull had also left his role as Mr. Thompson and the characters would depart together in episode 36. She also revealed that both characters could return in the future, saying "our producer has said to me that it's a revolving door, so it would be lovely to pop back for a bunch of episodes." Dryzek's character, Jasmine is killed off in episode 37 when she was stabbed after keeping a scalpel in her front pocket. Dryzek said in an interview with Victoria Wilson of What's on TV that she felt her character's death is an "almighty way for Jasmine to bow out" and thought that transferring Jasmine to London would have been "wrong". Arfwedson's departure was confirmed on 10 September 2017, and Zosia departs in episode 51 after deciding to move to America to further her career. In November 2017, McFadden hinted that he would be leaving his role as Raf di Lucca after appearing in Strictly Come Dancing had inspired him to try new roles. Raf departs in episode 62; his exit was kept out of spoilers for "maximum impact".

Bernie Wolfe (Jemma Redgrave) was revealed to be returning on 13 September 2016, following her departure at the end of the previous series. She returns in episode 7. Advanced spoilers released on 25 July 2017 revealed that Bernie would be departing again, making her final appearance in episode 44. On 10 February 2017, it was announced that former Casualty character Ben "Lofty" Chiltern, portrayed by Lee Mead, would join the cast of Holby City. Lofty makes his first appearance in episode 32. Jaye Jacobs was also confirmed to reprise her role as staff nurse Donna Jackson, having last appeared in 2011. Donna returns in episode 38. The reintroduction of Fran Reynolds (Carli Norris), an agency nurse who shared a backstory with Jac, was revealed on 7 March 2017. She returns in episode 32 and later became a nurse on the AAU. Hermione Gulliford joins the cast as consultant neurosurgeon Roxanna MacMillan in episode 55 after previously appearing in three episodes in series 15. On 4 October 2017, Digital Spy exclusively revealed that Olga Fedori would be reprising her role as Frieda Petrenko. Harper spoke out about Fedori's return as Frieda, telling viewers to "expect fireworks from these two huge personalities." Frieda returns in episode 63.

Christian Vit joined the cast as Matteo Rossini, a consultant on cardiothoracic surgery ward, Darwin, and makes his first appearance in episode 8. On 10 February 2017, it was announced that Ayesha Dharker and David Ajao would join the cast as general surgeon Nina Karnik, who is married to Matteo, and F1 Damon Ford respectively. Nina debuts in episode 31, whereas Damon first appears in episode 36. Vit finished filming after one year in the role and Dharker and Ajao finished filming after six months in their roles. Damon departs in episode 59, while Matteo and Nina depart together in the following episode. After appearing for one episode in February 2017, Billy Postlethwaite reprised his role as general surgerical registrar Fredrik Johansson, the son of Hanssen, for 12 episodes between episode 48 and episode 59. Fredrik appears for one further episode, in episode 62. Paul McGann was announced to be joining the cast in April 2017 as surgeon Professor John Gaskell, with his first scenes airing in December. The character is billed as a "surgical star with irrepressible charm", while McGann was delighted to join the show and called John "interesting". John debuts in episode 61. The introductions of F1 doctors Nicky McKendrick, portrayed by Belinda Owusu, and Meena Chowdhury, played by Salma Hoque, were announced on 29 September 2017. The pair are friends from school, although find their friendship tested by the hospital experience. Hall said that the doctors would "fight to survive" in the hospital as they came under scrutiny from Jac. Nicky and Meena first appear in episode 63.

The series features several recurring characters, and numerous guest stars. Louisa Clein first appears as Kim Whitfield, a love interest for Raf, in episode 1. Her son Parker Whitfield (Louis Savison) first appears in episode 2. Both characters depart in episode 10. Clein appears again in episodes 19 and 20, while Davison returns in episode 22. Clein reprises the role in episode 53 for one episode, which also serves as Davison's departure. Tessa Peake-Jones reprises her role as Imelda Cousins, the former acting CEO of the hospital who last appeared in the fifteenth series, in episode 3. Ahead of her return, Peake-Jones said that returning to Holby City was "like returning home". Mark Healy was revealed to be returning to his role as Robbie Medcalf, Serena's former partner, on 13 September 2016. He appears in episode 5. Nic Jackman reprises his role as Cameron Dunn, an F1 doctor and Bernie's son, in episode 8. He departs in episode 14, but reappears in episodes 31 and 64. Jamie Nichols reprises his role as Lee Cannon, Dominic's former partner, in episode 11. Serena's daughter, Elinor Campbell (Amy McCallum), is reintroduced for two episodes from episode 12. Mr T's mother, Birdie Thompson (Susan Brown), is introduced for one episode, in episode 13. The character is reintroduced for one episode, appearing in episode 30.

Former recurring characters Carole Copeland (Julia Deakin) and Barry Copeland (Nicholas Ball) return for one episode in episode 14, and Carole was revealed to appear in further episodes on 5 June 2017; she appears in episode 42. Macey Chipping reprises her role as Evie Fletcher, the daughter of Fletch, in episode 24. The reintroduction of Kyle Greenham (Alan Morrissey), an agency nurse and Dom's former partner, was revealed on 7 March 2017; he guest appears in episode 27. Gemma Oaten stars as Sydney Somers, an agency nurse who clashes with Fletch, in episodes 27 and 28. Mia Barron, the niece of Donna, is reintroduced in episode 42 for one episode, having last appeared in the thirteenth series. Briana Shann was recast in the role. Ella Fletcher (Bo London) and Theo Fletcher (Stanley Rabbetts), the youngest children of Fletch, appear in episode 47. Nick Rhys first appears as guest character Jeremy Warren in episode 56. Jeremy is the "grieving" son of a patient who died under the care of Ric and Donna. Rhys was originally contracted for 4-5 episodes before his contract was extended to 7-8 episodes. Imogen Stubbs appears as Evelyn Chapman, the estranged mother of Morven, in episode 58.

This series features seven crossover appearances from characters of sister show, Casualty. Paramedic Jez Andrews, portrayed by Lloyd Everitt, guest stars in episodes 16 and 17. The character is involved in a storyline in which he has sex with Isaac, despite Isaac being in a relationship with Dom. Receptionist Noel Garcia, portrayed by Tony Marshall, guest stars in episode 23. Staff nurse Robyn Miller, portrayed by Amanda Henderson, appears in episode 32 to aid Lofty's introduction. Poppy Jhakra, who appeared as agency nurse Amira Zafar in Casualty, revealed she would be guest appearing in Holby City on 21 June 2017. Amira appears in episodes 53 and 56. Paramedic Iain Dean, portrayed by Michael Stevenson, appears in episode 62.

Main characters 
David Ajao as Damon Ford
Chizzy Akudolu as Mo Effanga
David Ames as Dominic Copeland
James Anderson as Oliver Valentine
Camilla Arfwedson as Zosia March
Bob Barrett as Sacha Levy
Ayesha Dharker as Nina Karnik
Lucinda Dryzek as Jasmine Burrows
Eleanor Fanyinka as Morven Digby
Olga Fedori as Frieda Petrenko
Hermione Gulliford as Roxanna MacMillan
Guy Henry as Henrik Hanssen
Salma Hoque as Meena Chowdhury
Jaye Jacobs as Donna Jackson
Rosie Marcel as Jac Naylor
Joe McFadden as Raf di Lucca
Paul McGann as John Gaskell
Lee Mead as Ben "Lofty" Chiltern
John Michie as Guy Self
Belinda Owusu as Nicky McKendrick
Hugh Quarshie as Ric Griffin
Jemma Redgrave as Bernie Wolfe
Catherine Russell as Serena Campbell
Christian Vit as Matteo Rossini
Alex Walkinshaw as Adrian Fletcher
Kaye Wragg as Essie Harrison

Recurring characters 
Darcey Burke as Emma Naylor-Maconie
Louis Davison as Parker Whitfield
Marc Elliott as Isaac Mayfield
Kaisa Hammarlund as Inga Olsen
Ben Hull as Derwood "Mr T" Thompson
Nic Jackman as Cameron Dunn
Jonathan McGuiness as Tristan Wood
Carli Norris as Fran Reynolds
Billy Postlethwaite as Fredrik Johansson
Nick Rhys as Jeremy Warren
Jules Robertson as Jason Haynes
Jack Hawkins as Alex Lambert

Guest characters 
Susan Brown as Birdie Thompson
Louisa Clein as Kim Whitfield
Macey Chipping as Evie Fletcher
Julia Deakin as Carole Copeland
Lloyd Everitt as Jez Andrews
Mark Healy as Robbie Medcalf
Amanda Henderson as Robyn Miller
Poppy Jhakra as Amira Zafar
Caroline Lee-Johnson as Patsy Brassvine
Bo London as Ella Fletcher
Tony Marshall as Noel Garcia
Amy McCallum as Elinor Campbell
Alan Morrissey as Kyle Greenham
Jamie Nichols as Lee Cannon
Gemma Oaten as Sydney Somers
Rob Ostlere as Arthur Digby
Tessa Peake-Jones as Imelda Cousins
Stanley Rabbetts as Theo Fletcher
Laura Rogers as Jemima Chase
Briana Shann as Mia Barron
Michael Stevenson as Iain Dean
Imogen Stubbs as Evelyn Chapman

References
Sources

 Final viewing figures: 

Citations

External links
 Holby City at BBC Online
 Holby City at the Internet Movie Database

19
2016 British television seasons
2017 British television seasons